Italian-French singer Carla Bruni has released six studio albums, five singles, six promotional singles and five music videos. In 2003, her debut album Quelqu'un m'a dit, produced by Louis Bertignac, was released in Europe with success in Francophone countries. Three songs from the album appear in Hans Canosa's 2005 American film Conversations with Other Women, the song Le Plus Beau du quartier was used in H&M's Christmas 2006 commercial, and the title track was featured in the 2003 movie Le Divorce and in the 2009 movie (500) Days of Summer.  In January 2010, her song "L'amoureuse" was featured in an episode of NBC's Chuck, "Chuck vs. First Class".

Her second album, No Promises containing poems by William Butler Yeats, Emily Dickinson, W. H. Auden, Dorothy Parker, Walter de la Mare, and Christina Rossetti, set to music, was released in January 2007. She released her third album Comme si de rien n'était on 11 July 2008. The songs were self-penned except for one rendition of "You Belong to Me" and another song featuring Michel Houellebecq's poem La Possibilité d'une île set to music. Royalties from the album were planned to be donated to unidentified charitable and humanitarian causes.

Albums

Studio albums

Live albums

Singles

As main artist

Promotional singles

As featured artist

Other charted songs

Music videos

Notes

References

Pop music discographies
Discographies of French artists